Voigt–Thomson law describes anisotropic magnetoresistance effect in a thin film strip as a relationship between the electric resistivity and the direction of electric current:

where:
  is the angle of direction of current in relation to the direction of magnetic field
  is the initial resistivity
  is the change of resistivity (proportional to MR ratio)

The equation can also be expressed as:

where:
  is the parallel component of resistivity
  is the perpendicular component

References 

Spintronics